Liberato (occasionally stylized as LIBERATO) is an Italian singer and songwriter whose identity is unknown.
Although the language of composition of his texts is mainly Neapolitan, he is used to amalgamate words or entire sentences in Italian, English, French and Spanish.

Career
Liberato's career began on February 14, 2017 with the release of his first single, "Nove Maggio" on his YouTube channel. The next day the song was released in digital form on streaming platforms, enjoying some success for critics and the general public. On May 9, the singer's second single, "Tu t'e scurdat' and me", was released. It was released on digital platforms on May 17. With this music video for the first time the figure of Liberato himself appears. 2017 ends with the release, on 19 September on YouTube and three days later on music streaming services, of "Gaiola portafortuna".

The date of release of the video has a double symbolism, corresponding both to the holiday of San Gennaro, patron saint of Naples, and to the anniversary of the Castel Volturno massacre, when the Camorra killed six Italian-African immigrants.

On January 20, the video of "Me staje appennenn' amò" was released on YouTube, instead the release on digital streaming platforms occurrer on June 12. Within the music video, particular emphasis is placed on the LGBTQ theme.

After months of absence from social networks, a few minutes after the end of May 9, 2019 Liberato publishes his first album, homonymously called Liberato, composed of eleven tracks including five unreleased plus "Gaiola", reworking in voice and piano version of the song "Gaiola portafortuna".

In addition to the unreleased songs of the album there is a series of videos in five episodes called CRV (Capri Rendez-Vous).

In 2020 he wrote and sang the soundtrack of the film Ultras, released on Netflix and in selected cinemas. On 23 March he released the album Ultras on streaming platforms, in which the songs that form the background to the homonymous film are collected. 3D (pseudonym of Robert Del Naja, member of the British collective Massive Attack) and Gaika also collaborate in the creation of the songs.

Subsequently Liberato announced a concert at the Mediolanum Forum in Milan on April 25, 2020, later adding another show on April 26 after the sold out tickets. However, due to the COVID-19 pandemic, both concerts were initially postponed and later moved to a single date scheduled for September 9, 2022 at San Siro.

On May 9, 2021, the single "E te veng 'a piglià" was released, followed on June 22 by "Chiagne Ancora", a Ghali song on which Liberato collaborated vocally with J Lord.

On May 9, 2022 Liberato releases his second album Liberato II, consisting of six unreleased tracks plus a cover. For each track, as many music videos have been published on the artist's YouTube channel. A particular track to have a MV with actors is Partenope with the dancer Tonia Laterza and the actor Giacomo Rizzo, while the other 6 songs are accompanied with visuals.

On 20 July 2022 he held a free concert in Procida called "Miez 'O Mare" (In the midst of the sea)

Identity 
Precisely because of the artist's choice to remain anonymous, his life remains a mystery. In an exclusive e-mail interview, granted to the music magazine Rolling Stone, he only declared that he was born in Naples and that his name was Liberato, even if none of this news has ever been confirmed by authoritative third-party sources or official documentation.

The mystery surrounding his real identity is a distinctive trait of the figure of Liberato, appearing in public exclusively hooded, accompanied by an impersonator or concealed by a screen.

Discography

Studio albums

Soundtracks 
 2020 – Ultras

Singles

As lead artist 
 2017 – "Nove maggio"
 2017 – "Tu t'e scurdat' 'e me"
 2017 – "Gaiola portafortuna"
 2018 – "Me staje appennenn' amò"
 2018 – "Intostreet"
 2018 – "Je te voglio bene assaje"
 2020 – "We Come from Napoli" (feat. 3D & Gaika)
 2020 – "'O core nun tene padrone" (feat. 3D)
 2021 – "E te veng' a piglià"

As featured artist
 2021 – "Chiagne ancora" (feat. Ghali & J Lord)
 2021 – "Je 'o tteng e t'o ddòng'" (feat. Bawrut)

References

External links 

  

People from the Province of Naples
Living people
21st-century Italian singers
21st-century Italian male singers
Year of birth missing (living people)